Boogies Diner (also known as Boogie's Diner) is a syndicated sitcom which first aired from September 17, 1994 until 1995. It stars Jim J. Bullock, Monika Schnarre, and James Marsden in one of his first appearances on television. The series ended in 1995. The series was produced and distributed by MTM Enterprises (now 20th Television).

Plot
The plot of the show revolves around eight teenagers who work at Boogies Diner, a popular mall hangout. The characters work in various departments of the "diner", which also includes a fashion and music outlet. Gerald (Jim J. Bullock) is the nerdy manager who tries to keep the teenage mischief from affecting the business.

Filmed in Hamilton, Ontario, the series was compared to the American series Saved by the Bell. After the series was canceled, episodes aired on Nickelodeon and CH in Canada.

Cast
Jim J. Bullock as Gerald
Richard Chevolleau as Tim
Katie Griffin as Nikki
James Marsden as Jason
Monika Schnarre as Zoya
Rob Shewchuk as Rob
Robin Stapler as Cynthia
Joy Tanner as Cheryl Anne
Zack Ward as Kirby

References

External links
 

1990s American teen sitcoms
1990s American workplace comedy television series
1994 American television series debuts
1995 American television series endings
1990s Canadian teen sitcoms
1990s Canadian workplace comedy television series
1994 Canadian television series debuts
1995 Canadian television series endings
First-run syndicated television shows in Canada
First-run syndicated television programs in the United States
English-language television shows
Television series by MTM Enterprises
Television series about teenagers